The 1902 All-Western college football team consists of American football players selected to the All-Western teams chosen by various selectors for the 1902 Western Conference football season.

All-Western selections

Ends
 Allen Abbott, Wisconsin (CT, CDN, CRH, MEW, MJ-2, W)
 Curtis Redden, Michigan (CDN, MEW, MJ-2)
 Edward L. Rogers, Minnesota (CT, MJ-1)
 James F. Cook, Illinois (CRH, MJ-1)
 Frederick A. Speik, Chicago (W)

Tackles
 Joe Maddock, Michigan (CT, CDN, CRH, MEW, MJ-1, W)
 E. W. Farr, Chicago (CT, CDN, CRH, MJ-2)
 Fred Schacht, Minnesota (MJ-2, W)
 J. M. Davidson, Purdue (MJ-1)
 Jake Stahl, Illinois (MEW)

Guards
 John G. Flynn, Minnesota (CT, CDN, CRH, MEW, MJ-1, W)
 Dan McGugin, Michigan (CRH, MEW, MJ-2, W) (CFHOF)
  Herbert Ahlswede, Chicago (CT, MJ-2)
 J. Arthur Baird, Northwestern (CDN)
 Arnie Lerum, Wisconsin (MEW, MJ-1)

Centers
 Shorty Ellsworth, Chicago (CT, CRH, MJ-1)
 Emil Skow, Wisconsin (CDN, MEW, W)
 George W. Gregory, Michigan (MJ-2)

Quarterbacks
 Boss Weeks, Michigan (CT, CDN, CRH, MEW, MJ-1, W)
 Sigmund Harris, Minnesota (MJ-2)

Halfbacks
 Willie Heston, Michigan (CT, CDN, CRH, MEW, MJ-1, W) (CFHOF)
 Paul J. Jones, Michigan (CT, W [fullback], MEW [fullback], MJ-2 [fullback])
 Harry J. Van Valkenburg, Minnesota (CRH, MEW, MJ-1)
 Louis J. Salmon, Notre Dame (CDN)
 James M. Sheldon, Chicago (W)
 Albert Herrnstein, Michigan (MEW, MJ-2)
 E. J. Vanderboom, Wisconsin (MJ-2)

Fullbacks
Everett Sweeley, Michigan (CT, CDN, CRH)
Warren Cummings Knowlton, Minnesota (MJ-1)

Key
CT = Chicago Tribune

CDN = Chicago Daily News selected by Fred Hayner

CRH = Chicago Record-Herald selected by Carl M. Green

MEW = Milwaukee Evening Wisconsin

MJ = The Minneapolis Journal

W = Woodruff

CFHOF = College Football Hall of Fame

See also
1902 College Football All-America Team

References

All-Western team
All-Western college football teams